The Soviet Union's 1978 nuclear test series was a group of 31 nuclear tests conducted in 1978. These tests  followed the 1977 Soviet nuclear tests series and preceded the 1979 Soviet nuclear tests series.

References

1978
1978 in the Soviet Union
1978 in military history
Explosions in 1978